Rudge is a civil parish in Shropshire, England.  It contains four listed buildings that are recorded in the National Heritage List for England.  Of these, one is listed at Grade II*, the middle of the three grades, and the others are at Grade II, the lowest grade.  The parish is almost entirely rural, and the listed buildings consist of two houses, outbuildings, and an animal pound.


Key

Buildings

References

Citations

Sources

Lists of buildings and structures in Shropshire